Verman may refer to:

Ajit Verman (1947–2016), Indian composer
R. Verman, Indian art director
Verman (river), river in Murmansk Oblast, Russia
Verman (no last name), a character in the Penrod stories written by Booth Tarkington